Esther Turpin (born 29 April 1996 in Saint-Joseph, Réunion) is a French athlete competing in the combined events. She finished fourth in the heptathlon at the 2017 European U23 Championships.

International competitions

Personal bests
Outdoor
200 metres – 24.53 (+1.8 m/s, Albi 2018)
800 metres – 2:12.74 (Albi 2018)
100 metres hurdles – 13.19 (+0.6 m/s, Cergy-Pontoise 2018)
High jump – 1.79 (Berlin 2018)
Long jump – 6.32 (+1.3 m/s, Götzis 2018)
Shot put – 13.21 (Götzis 2018)
Javelin Throw – 46.65 (Berlin 2018)
Heptathlon – 6230 (Götzis 2018)
Outdoor
800 metres – 2:17.20 (Lyon 2018)
60 metres hurdles – 8.28 (Aubiére 2018)
High jump – 1.71 (Lyon 2018)
Long jump – 6.09 (Liévin 2018)
Shot put – 13.22 (Liévin 2018)
Pentathlon – 4364 (Liévin 2018)

References

1996 births
Living people
French heptathletes
Sportspeople from Réunion